James Fleming Gordon (May 18, 1918 – February 9, 1990) was a United States district judge of the United States District Court for the Western District of Kentucky.

Education and career

Born in Madisonville, Kentucky, Gordon received a Bachelor of Laws from the University of Kentucky College of Law in 1941. He was in private practice in Madisonville from 1941 to 1942, serving in the United States Army during World War II, from 1942 to 1945. He returned to private practice from 1945 to 1965, also serving as a campaign chairman for Kentucky Democratic Party in 1955, and as chairman of the Kentucky Public Service Commission from 1956 to 1960. He was a special counsel to the Governor of Kentucky in 1965, and speakers chairman of the Kentucky Democratic Party in 1966.

Federal judicial service

On June 24, 1965, Gordon was nominated by President Lyndon B. Johnson to a seat on the United States District Court for the Western District of Kentucky vacated by Judge Roy Mahlon Shelbourne. Gordon was confirmed by the United States Senate on July 22, 1965, and received his commission on July 23, 1965. He served as Chief Judge from 1969 to 1976, assuming senior status due to a certified disability on January 1, 1976 and serving in that capacity until his death on February 9, 1990.

References

Sources
 

1918 births
1990 deaths
Judges of the United States District Court for the Western District of Kentucky
United States district court judges appointed by Lyndon B. Johnson
20th-century American judges
People from Madisonville, Kentucky
University of Kentucky alumni
United States Army personnel of World War II
20th-century American lawyers
University of Kentucky College of Law alumni